J. Brian Moore is a retired American soccer midfielder who played professionally in the National Professional Soccer League, A-League and Eastern Indoor Soccer League.

Moore attended Maryville College.  In 2013, he was selected for induction into the Maryville Wall of Fame.  After college, Moore joined the Atlanta Magic of the USISL.  In 1994, the Magic won the USISL indoor championship as Moore was named the "Sizzling Four" Most Valuable Player.  During the 1994-1995 indoor season, Moore briefly played for the Dayton Dynamo of the National Professional Soccer League.  In 1995, Moore played for the Atlanta Ruckus as it went to the A-League final.  In 1996, he began the season with the Ruckus, was released, then rejoined the team late in the season.  That fall, he joined the Cincinnati Silverbacks of the NPSL.  In 1997, he played for the Columbus Comets of the Eastern Indoor Soccer League, leading the team in scoring.  In 1998, Moore played at least one game for the Atlanta Silverbacks.  He coaches youth soccer in the Atlanta area.

References

Living people
A-League (1995–2004) players
American soccer coaches
American soccer players
Atlanta Magic players
Atlanta Silverbacks players
Cincinnati Silverbacks players
Dayton Dynamo players
Eastern Indoor Soccer League players
National Professional Soccer League (1984–2001) players
USISL players
Year of birth missing (living people)
Place of birth missing (living people)
Association football midfielders